The PHINMA – University of Pangasinan, also known as UPang, is a private and non-sectarian university located at Dagupan, Pangasinan, Philippines. It is a member of the PHINMA Education Network (PEN). It offers practically all undergraduate and graduate courses that Metro Manila universities offer. It has a staff of about 300 faculty members and employees.

History

Dagupan Institute
The University of Pangasinan started operation in 1925 as the Dagupan Institute, which offered elementary, secondary and vocational courses. It was founded by Dean Francisco Benitez of the University of the Philippines, who became the chairman of the board of directors; Dr. Blas F. Rayos; Dr. Apolinario delos Santos, then President of the University of Manila; Dr. Mariano delos Santos, then Dean of the University of Manila; Dr. Sylvestre Pascual; and Dr. Blas F. Rayos, then Dean of the College of Education of the University of Manila. Rayos became the president of the school and headed it for 45 years until 1975 when he died and was succeeded by his son, George O. Rayos, who served as president until 1987.

In 1937, the College of Liberal Arts was established with the president Blas F. Rayos Sr. as its first dean.

Dagupan Junior College
In 1941, the school was renamed the Dagupan Junior College. Its operation was interrupted by the outbreak of World War II in December 1941. It resumed operation in 1945 immediately after the war. Four courses were added to its offering soon after. These were civil engineering, architecture, graduate school, and secretarial science. Shortly thereafter, additional courses were offered such as secondary education, law, home economics, nursing, and commerce, with major in accounting, management, banking and finance, and economics.

Dagupan Colleges
In 1950, the school assumed the name Dagupan Colleges, and the Graduate School added courses leading to the degrees of Master of Arts in Philosophy and Master of Science in Business Administration. The school started a review class in Nursing in 1954. Eventually, review classes in Accounting, Civil Engineering and Law were offered. The year 1959 saw further expansion of curricular offerings with the opening of courses leading to the degrees of Bachelor of Science in Foods and Nutrition, and Bachelor of Science in journalism.

In the next decade following were added: the organization of Naval Reserve Officers' Training Corps (NROTC) and the Naval Women's Auxiliary Corps in 1960, and the offering of the Sanitary Engineering course in 1965.

Status
On July 3, 1968, the college was converted into a university by virtue of the University Charter granted by the Department of Education. Thereforth, the school operated as the University of Pangasinan.

In 2009, it became a member of the PHINMA Education Network.

Sister schools
 Araullo University, Cabanatuan, Philippines
 Cagayan de Oro College, Cagayan de Oro, Philippines
 University of Iloilo, Iloilo City, Philippines
 Southwestern University, Cebu City, Philippines]
 Saint Jude College, Manila, Philippines

References

External links
 
Official Website of PHINMA Education Network
Official Website of PHINMA
Facebook
Instagram

Universities and colleges in Dagupan
Educational institutions established in 1925